Mattel Inc. v. Walking Mountain Productions, 353 F.3d 792 (9th Cir. 2003), was a case between Mattel and Tom Forsythe in which Mattel sued Forsythe for the production and sale of photographs portraying "Barbie" dolls. Mattel alleged that Forsythe's use of Barbie's name and likeness in his "Food Chain Barbie" photo series infringed on their copyrights, trademarks, and trade dress. The court held that Mattel's trademark and trade dress claims were "groundless or unreasonable" and therefore ordered Mattel to pay 1.8 million dollars in legal fees to Forsythe under the Lanham Act.

Background

Response

See also 

 Tom Forsythe, the Utah photographer sued by Mattel in this case
 Mattel, Inc. v. MCA Records, Inc., a lawsuit between Mattel and MCA Records involving the song "Barbie Girl" by Aqua

References 

United States case law
Mattel
Barbie
Toy controversies